Margaret Lucille Jeanne Parker (born 24 July 1943) is an English politician who served as a Member of the European Parliament (MEP) for the East Midlands region between 2014 and 2019. She was born in Grantham and educated at Kesteven and Grantham Girls' School and De Montfort University, where she read Law.

Parker stood as a candidate for Libertas in the 2009 European election in the East Midlands. She was second on the party list; the party won 0.6% of the vote and no seats.

By the following year she had defected to the UK Independence Party (UKIP). She stood in Sherwood in the 2010 general election, finishing 5th (1,490 votes, 3%). In 2012, she stood in the Corby by-election, finishing third with 5,108 votes (14.3%).

In 2014, Parker was nominated as the second candidate on the East Midlands list for UKIP in preparation for the 2014 European Parliament election. She was subsequently elected alongside Roger Helmer as a UKIP MEP for the East Midlands constituency.

Following the election of Henry Bolton as leader of UKIP in 2017, Parker was appointed deputy leader. After Bolton refused to stand down following a vote of no confidence by UKIP's National Executive Committee, Parker resigned as deputy leader.

During the leadership of Gerard Batten, Parker served as Home Affairs spokeswoman and Deputy Chair of the UK Independence Party, but resigned her post and membership of the party in April 2019, defecting to the Brexit Party, alongside Jane Collins & Jill Seymour, citing Batten's defence of Carl Benjamin's 2016 tweet saying he "wouldn't even rape" Labour MP Jess Phillips.

Despite her defection, Parker was not selected as a Brexit Party candidate for the 2019 European Parliament elections, and ceased to be a Member of the European Parliament on 26 May 2019.

References

External links

1943 births
Living people
Alumni of De Montfort University
UK Independence Party MEPs
Brexit Party MEPs
MEPs for England 2014–2019
21st-century women MEPs for England
People educated at Kesteven and Grantham Girls' School
UK Independence Party parliamentary candidates